Ottway is an unincorporated community in northern Greene County, Tennessee. It located a few miles off Tennessee State Route 172. It was the location of Ottway Elementary School until its closure in 2019. The school is now North Greene Middle School.

References

Unincorporated communities in Greene County, Tennessee
Unincorporated communities in Tennessee